Thomas Hugh Evelyn Goldie, DFC and Bar (5 December 191923 December 2010) was an British cricketer, pilot, and theatre director. He was born in Tywardreath, Cornwall and died in Isleworth, Middlesex.

References

External links
Cricket Archive

1919 births
2010 deaths
English cricketers
English theatre directors
People from Tywardreath and Par
Oxfordshire cricketers
Royal Air Force pilots of World War II
Recipients of the Distinguished Flying Cross (United Kingdom)